Baron Kinross, of Glasclune in the County of Haddington, is a title in the Peerage of the United Kingdom. It was created on 15 July 1902 for Scottish lawyer John Balfour, Liberal politician and Lord President of the Court of Session.  His grandson, the third baron, was an author and journalist.  the title is held by the latter's nephew, the fifth baron, who succeeded his father in 1985.

All four deceased barons are buried at the south end of Lords Row in Dean Cemetery, Edinburgh.

Barons Kinross (1902)
John Balfour, 1st Baron Kinross (1837–1905)
Patrick Balfour, 2nd Baron Kinross (1870–1939)
(John) Patrick Douglas Balfour, 3rd Baron Kinross (1904–1976)
David Andrew Balfour, 4th Baron Kinross (1906–1985)
Christopher Patrick Balfour, 5th Baron Kinross (b. 1949)

The heir apparent is the present holder's son, Alan Ian Balfour (b. 1978).

References

Books cited

Baronies in the Peerage of the United Kingdom
Kinross
Noble titles created in 1902
Noble titles created for UK MPs